Six Mile Lake (South) Water Aerodrome  is located on Six Mile Lake, Ontario, Canada.

See also
 Six Mile Lake (Hungry Bay) Water Aerodrome

References

Registered aerodromes in Ontario
Seaplane bases in Ontario